Henry Anton Eilers (August 11, 1870 – June 30, 1901) was a gunner's mate serving in the United States Navy who received the Medal of Honor for bravery.

Biography 
Eilers was born August 11, 1870, in Newark, New Jersey and enlisted in the United States Navy in 1885. Hot embers blew down one of the ammunition chutes, nearly injuring three other members of the crew and causing others to run for their lives. Although the ammunition could have ignited at any time due to the hot embers Eilers risked his life to remain at his post in the magazine until all of the burning particles had been stamped out.

For his actions Eilers received the Medal of Honor on November 22, 1892.

In addition to the Medal of Honor Secretary of the Navy Benjamin F. Tracy issued General Order number 404 directing that Eilers be promoted to the rank of acting gunner for "extraordinary heroism".  His date of rank as gunner was November 5, 1892.

Death and burial
While serving aboard the Kentucky in the Philippines on June 30, 1901, Eilers died of heart disease. His body was returned to the United States in September 1901 and buried a few days later in Cypress Hills Cemetery Brooklyn, New York. His grave can be found in section 6, lot 202B.

Medal of Honor citation 
Rank and organization: Gunner's Mate, U.S. Navy. Born: 1871, Newark, N.J. Accredited to: New Jersey. G.O. No.: 404, 22 November 1892.

Citation:

On board the U.S.S. Philadelphia during the sham attack on Fort McHenry, Baltimore, Md., 17 September 1892. Displaying extraordinary heroism in the line of his profession on this occasion, Eilers remained at his post in the magazine and stamped out the burning particles of a prematurely exploded cartridge which had blown down the chute.

See also 

 List of Medal of Honor recipients in non-combat incidents

References

External links 
 
 

1870 births
1901 deaths
United States Navy Medal of Honor recipients
United States Navy sailors
United States Navy officers
Military personnel from Newark, New Jersey
Burials in New York (state)
Non-combat recipients of the Medal of Honor